Doluca is a village in the Batman District of Batman Province in Turkey. The village is populated by Kurds of the Reman and Reşkotan tribes and had a population of 424 in 2021.

The hamlet of Esentepe is attached to the village.

References 

Villages in Batman District
Kurdish settlements in Batman Province